Kung Fu Panda 3 is a 2016  computer-animated martial arts comedy film produced by DreamWorks Animation, China Film Group Corporation, Oriental DreamWorks and Zhong Ming You Ying Film and distributed by 20th Century Fox. It is the third installment in the Kung Fu Panda franchise and the sequel to Kung Fu Panda 2 (2011). The film was directed by Jennifer Yuh Nelson and Alessandro Carloni (in his feature directorial debut) and written by Jonathan Aibel and Glenn Berger.

Jack Black, Dustin Hoffman, Angelina Jolie, Lucy Liu, Seth Rogen, David Cross, James Hong and Jackie Chan reprise their roles from the previous films, with Randall Duk Kim reprising his role of Oogway from the first film. They are joined by Bryan Cranston (replacing Fred Tatasciore, who went on to voice Master Bear), J. K. Simmons and Kate Hudson in the roles of Li Shan, Kai, and Mei Mei, respectively. In the film, Po is reunited with his birth father and discovers the existence of a secret Panda Village, but must soon learn to master chi and prepare the pandas to fight against Kai, a spirit warrior intent on destroying Oogway's legacy. The film was dedicated to Nancy Bernstein, who served as Head of Production at DreamWorks Animation, as she died from colorectal cancer at the age of 55 on September 18, 2015.

Kung Fu Panda 3 premiered at the TCL Chinese Theatre in Los Angeles on January 16, 2016. It received a limited release in China on January 23, 2016 for a special three-hour sneak preview and was released in the United States on January 29, 2016 in 3D, grossing $521 million worldwide against its $145 million budget, becoming the second highest-grossing film released in the month of January behind American Sniper. The film received generally positive reviews; the Rotten Tomatoes critical consensus praises the visuals and narrative. A spin-off animated series, Kung Fu Panda: The Paws of Destiny, aired on Amazon Prime Video from November 16, 2018 to July 4, 2019, while a sequel animated series, Kung Fu Panda: The Dragon Knight, began airing on Netflix in July 2022, the latter of which features Black reprising his role as Po. A fourth film is currently in production and is set for release on March 8, 2024.

Plot
In the Spirit Realm, Grand Master Oogway fights against General Kai, a spirit warrior yak who has defeated all the other dead kung fu masters and stolen their chi. Oogway has his own chi stolen, but not before he warns Kai that someone is destined to stop him. Kai uses the chi he stole to return to the Mortal Realm.

Meanwhile, Master Shifu announces his retirement from teaching, and names Po as his successor. Po's first attempts to teach inadvertently injure the Furious Five, and Shifu advises Po should try to be more like himself and less like Shifu. Disheartened, Po returns home, where he meets Li Shan, a panda that both quickly realize is Po's biological father, who came to find Po after receiving a sign from the universe that his son was alive. The two immediately bond, much to the dismay and jealousy of Po's adoptive father Mr. Ping.

After introducing Li to Shifu and the Five, Po joins the Five to defend the Valley of Peace from Kai's jade zombies, the remains of the kung fu masters that had their chi stolen. Through research, the group learns that Kai and Oogway were once friends, and that Kai saved a wounded Oogway's life by taking him to a secret panda village to be healed. The pandas taught Oogway to give healing chi, but Kai learned to take chi from others for his own personal power, forcing Oogway to banish him to the Spirit Realm. Li offers to take Po to the village to learn chi and defeat Kai, while Shifu and the Five prepare to protect the Valley. Mr. Ping stows away, hoping to drive a wedge between Po and Li, but is soon discovered. Upon arriving at the village, Li refuses to teach Po chi until he has learned to live the relaxed lifestyle of a panda.

Kai, hoping to erase Oogway's legacy, steals the chi of every living kung fu master and destroys the Jade Palace. Only Master Tigress escapes, tracking down Po and telling him what happened. When Po demands that Li teach him how to use chi immediately,  Li confesses that he lied about knowing chi out of fear of losing his son again. Hurt by his father's misdirection, Po disowns Li and trains alone to defeat Kai, while a repentant Mr. Ping sympathizes with Li and assures that Po will forgive him. 

After an argument with Tigress, Po admits he cannot defeat Kai alone. Li, Mr. Ping and the pandas ask Po to teach them kung fu. Realizing what previously made him fail as a teacher, Po trains them to not imitate his kung fu but instead to use their everyday activities as kung fu skills. Between training, Po and Li reconcile, and both prepare for Kai's attack.

Kai arrives with his jade zombies and attacks the village. Po's students fight them, distracting Kai long enough for Po to use the Wuxi Finger Hold technique to banish Kai to the Spirit Realm. Kai, a spirit warrior, reveals that the technique only works on mortals and savagely attacks Po. To save the others, Po grabs Kai and uses the Wuxi Finger Hold on himself, banishing them both to the Spirit Realm. Infuriated, Kai binds Po and begins to steal his chi. In the mortal realm, Li, recognizing that finding one's true self is the key to unlocking chi, leads the others in giving their chi to Po. Rejuvenated, Po uses his now-augmented chi to destroy Kai.

With Kai gone, the kung fu masters have their chi restored. In the Spirit Realm, Oogway reveals that he sent Li a cosmic message explaining where to find Po. Oogway also reveals why he chose Po as the Dragon Warrior—as a panda, Po had the potential to become a master of both kung fu and chi. Oogway names Po his successor as Grand Master, and gives Po his mystic staff, which Po uses to return to the Mortal Realm. After reuniting with the others, Po takes on his new role at the restored Jade Palace, where all the pandas and the residents of the Valley of Peace learn kung fu and chi.

Voice cast

 Jack Black as Po.
 J. K. Simmons as Kai. 
 Bryan Cranston as Li Shan. Cranston replaces Fred Tatasciore, who had briefly voiced Li Shan in Kung Fu Panda 2.
 Angelina Jolie as Master Tigress.
 Dustin Hoffman as Master Shifu.
 James Hong as Mr. Ping.
 Jackie Chan as Master Monkey.
 Seth Rogen as Master Mantis.
 David Cross as Master Crane.
 Lucy Liu as Master Viper.
 Randall Duk Kim as Grand Master Oogway.
 Steele Gagnon as Bao.
 Liam Knight as Lei Lei. Knight previously voiced Baby Po in Kung Fu Panda 2.
 Wayne Knight as Big Fun, Hom-Lee.
 Barbara Dirikson as Grandma Panda.
 Willie Geist as Sum.
 Al Roker as Dim.
 Jean-Claude Van Damme as Master Croc.
 Fred Tatasciore as Master Bear. Tatasciore briefly voiced Li Shan in Kung Fu Panda 2.
 Stephen Kearin as Master Chicken.
 Pax Jolie-Pitt as Yoo.
 Knox Jolie-Pitt as Ku Ku.
 Kate Hudson as Mei Mei.
 Zahara Jolie-Pitt as Meng Meng.
 Shiloh Jolie-Pitt as Shuai Shuai.
 Ming Tsai as Ming.
 Mike Mitchell as Male Palace Goose, Smart Panda Villager.
 Kelly Cooney as Female Palace Goose.
 Mick Wingert as the Goose and Rabbit farmers. Wingert previously voiced Po in the Kung Fu Panda: Legends of Awesomeness animated series, further reprising the role after Kung Fu Panda 3 in the direct spin-off animated series Kung Fu Panda: The Paws of Destiny.

Production

Development
In 2010, DreamWorks Animation CEO Jeffrey Katzenberg announced that the Kung Fu Panda franchise was planned to have six movies, or "chapters," altogether. In July 2012, Kung Fu Panda 3 was officially confirmed by Bill Damaschke, DWA's chief creative officer.

The film was made as a co-production between DreamWorks Animation and Oriental DreamWorks, a Shanghai-based animation studio, founded in 2012 as a partnership between DreamWorks Animation and Chinese companies. One third of the film was made in China, and the rest in the United States, at DWA. This was the first time that any major American animated feature film had been co-produced with a Chinese firm. The filmmakers worked closely with SAPPRFT to ensure the film's release in China. As a film with a co-production status in China, it allowed the production companies to circumvent the country's strict import quota and take a greater share of box-office revenue than imported films. To ensure the film's success in China, in addition to the English version, the Chinese version of the film was also fully animated, making them the only versions that have the characters' lips synchronized with their voices.

Casting
Kung Fu Panda 3 saw the crew from the second film reunite, including director Jennifer Yuh Nelson, producer Melissa Cobb, screenplay writers Jonathan Aibel and Glenn Berger, and Guillermo del Toro as executive producer. Initially, Nelson was to direct the film alone, but by February 2015, Alessandro Carloni had joined her as a co-director. According to the report, Carloni, who had worked as an animation supervisor on the first film and a story artist on the second, joined Nelson after she requested strengthening "the director's bench" to ensure that the film is completed in a timely manner.

On April 9, 2013, DreamWorks Animation announced that Rebel Wilson, Bryan Cranston, and Mads Mikkelsen had joined the cast of the film. By April 2015, J.K. Simmons had replaced Mikkelsen, whose character had been rewritten. Five months later, Wilson was replaced by Kate Hudson due to an extended production schedule. The studio had to reanimate previously completed scenes to reflect Hudson's interpretation of the character.

The film's antagonist, Kai, is the first supernatural villain of the Kung Fu Panda film series outside of the television series. Described by del Toro as "the most formidable villain yet," the creators wanted him to stand apart from his predecessors. Nelson reasoned, "You can't go brawler because Tai Lung was brawler. You can't go smarter because Shen was smarter. Where can you go? You have to go supernatural, bigger, and even more intimidating."

Music

On July 25, 2014, it was announced that Hans Zimmer, who co-scored the first two Kung Fu Panda movies with John Powell, would return to score the film. The score is performed by the London Session Orchestra, includes choir pieces performed by The Metro Voices and Shanghai Roxi Musical Studio Choirs, and features performances from renowned Asian musicians such as Chinese pianist Lang Lang, Chinese cellist Jian Wang, erhu musician Guo Gan, Chinese Pipa player Wu Man, Taiwanese pop singer Jay Chou, and Canadian-Taiwanese young singer Patrick Brasca, who performs the main theme "Try" with Chou in the end credits. The soundtrack album was released on January 29, 2016 on Sony Classical. Powell did not return for the third installment but despite this, most of the themes he collaborated with Zimmer were worked into the score. Many themes from the score contained portions of the garage rock song "I'm So Sorry" by the American pop rock band Imagine Dragons. For the soundtrack, the song was portioned in the tracks "The Arrival of Kai", "The Hall of Heroes", "The Legend of Kai", "Jaded", "Po Belongs", "Kai Is Closer", "The Battle of Legends", and "The Spirit Realm". The soundtrack also includes additional music composed by Chinese-American composer Nathan Wang, Scottish composer Lorne Balfe, and Scottish composer Paul Mounsey.

Release

In September 2012, it was announced that Kung Fu Panda 3 would be released on March 18, 2016. On April 9, 2013, the film's release date was moved back to December 23, 2015. In December 2014, the film was pushed forward to its original release date of March 18, 2016, to avoid competition with Star Wars: The Force Awakens. In April 2015, the release date was once again shifted, this time to March 25, 2016. AMC Theatres partnered with Fox and DWA to play the movie in Mandarin at seven theaters and in Spanish at 14 locations in the U.S and Canada meaning there will be a mix of subtitled and dubbed formats of Kung Fu Panda 3. This will mark the first time that AMC is playing a major theatrical release in dubbed/subtitled Mandarin. The film had a day-and-date release starting from January 28 in South Korea, Russia, Ukraine, Jamaica and Puerto Rico and China and the U.S. and Canada on March 25, 2016. Other markets followed in March and April. According to Deadline Hollywood, the strategy behind such a staggered release was to take advantage of certain opportunistic dates which presented themselves such as the Chinese New Year in February for China.

Reception

Box office
Kung Fu Panda 3 grossed $143.5 million in the United States and Canada, and $377.6 million in other territories, for a worldwide total of $521.2 million, and is the lowest-grossing film in the series. According to Deadline Hollywood, the film made a net profit of $76.65 million, making it one of the top 20 most profitable releases of 2016.

In the United States and Canada, early speculation expected the film would open to about $40–45 million from 3,955 theaters, with Box Office Mojo reporting as high as a $53 million opening, on par with Kung Fu Panda 2s $47.7 million opening in 2011, but a significant decrease from the original film's $60.2 million opening in 2008. However, DreamWorks Animation and Fox gave a more conservative estimate of a "mid-$40 million" opening. Paul Dergarabedian, a senior analyst at Rentrak, said the film's opening "should land somewhere between the first two installments," noting that the film will likely appeal to families "with few options for appropriate entertainment at the multiplex of late." On January 27, two days before the film's release, Fandango reported that Kung Fu Panda 3 was the top advance ticket seller for the weekend, outperforming previous DreamWorks Animation films Home and Kung Fu Panda 2 , at the same point in their sale cycles. Box office pundits also noted that the film didn't face any serious competition with other new releases, such as The Finest Hours and Fifty Shades of Black, nor with holdovers The Revenant and Star Wars: The Force Awakens, which were all expected to gross around $10 million. In North America, Kung Fu Panda 3 topped the box office in its debut weekend with $41.3 million, making it the best opening weekend for an animated film in January and the third-highest weekend debut ever for the month. The film continued to top the North American box office during its second weekend, grossing $21.2 million.

In China, expectations were high for the film, with Nancy Tartaglione of Deadline Hollywood anticipating a bigger opening weekend than in the U.S. and a higher total gross. Conservative estimates for Kung Fu Panda 3'''s opening in China ranged from $35 million to upwards of $50 million. Even before the film's official Chinese release, it was already projected to surpass Monkey King: Hero Is Back as the country's highest-grossing animated film, which had earned $153 million at the box office in 2015, since Kung Fu Panda 3 had the additional benefits of opening a week before the Chinese New Year and Valentine's Day, and debuting during the school holidays in the Lunar New Year "blackout" period banning the release of foreign films, and therefore did not face competition from major Hollywood productions.

The film had a limited theatrical release in China on January 22, 2016, a week before its release in the United States. A three-hour special sneak preview was screened, earning $6.4 million from two different versions of the film topping the daily box office charts. Buoyed by good word-of-mouth, the film had a single-day opening of $16.3 million, the biggest of 2016 thus far, earning a total of $23.1 million including previews from its Saturday showings, giving Kung Fu Panda 3 one of China's highest-grossing openings.

Critical response
On Rotten Tomatoes, the film holds a approval rating of 86% based on 180 reviews and an average rating of 6.90/10. The site's critical consensus reads, "Kung Fu Panda 3 boasts the requisite visual splendor, but like its rotund protagonist, this sequel's narrative is also surprisingly nimble, adding up to animated fun for the whole family." On Metacritic, the film has a score of 66 out of 100 based on 34 critics, indicating "generally favorable reviews." Audiences polled by CinemaScore gave the film an average grade of "A" on an A+ to F scale.

IGN gave the film a score of 8.5 out of 10, commenting that "Kung Fu Panda 3 offers a fun-filled, action-packed conclusion to DreamWorks' endearing animated series." Screen Rant awarded it 2.5 out of 5, saying, "At times, it's a beautiful movie, filled with likable characters, as well as digestible gags, that should keep kids smiling and giggling–but, with a plethora of more ambitious animated options out there, passable might not justify the money (or time) required for a viewing." Glenn Kenny of RogerEbert.com awarded Kung Fu Panda 3 three out of four stars and wrote that the film "in spite of its abundant action–and for all the interspecies mashups, this is as much an action-adventure animated movie as it is a funny-animal animated movie–is a pretty relaxing experience for the adult viewer." Justin Chang of Variety gave a positive review, saying that "a winning lightness of touch prevails in this delightful continuation of the durable DreamWorks franchise." Christian Holub of Entertainment Weekly gave Kung Fu Panda 3 a rating of B, commenting that the film was "just complicated enough to reward steady viewers and just simple enough for parent escorts to enjoy without much prior knowledge." Michael Rechtshaffen of The Hollywood Reporter wrote that "while the storyline, in which Jack Black's dumpling-downing Dragon Warrior is reunited with his biological father, doesn't quite fulfill its prophecies, dramatically speaking, visually speaking it's all quite impressive–one of those very rare animated features that completely justifies its 3D glasses." Marter Parkinson of The Escapist gave the film three out of five stars, saying that "Kung Fu Panda 3 can best be described as 'another one,'" and called it "just a slight variation of the story told in the first film" and "a step down from the second film," but concluded that "it's a perfectly fine film, and if all you want is 'more of the same,' it won't disappoint." Forbes gave a mixed review, negatively comparing Kung Fu Panda 3 to its predecessors and describing it as "a comedown from the first two superb entries," but conceding that the film was "visually gorgeous and generally entertaining."

Accolades
At the 44th Annie Awards, Kung Fu Panda 3 received nominations for Best Animated Feature, Outstanding Achievement for Animated Effects in an Animated Production, Outstanding Achievement for Character Animation in a Feature Production, and Outstanding Achievement for Production Design in an Animated Feature Production. Black was nominated for Best Virtual Performance at the 2016 MTV Movie Awards and Most Wanted Pet at the 2017 Kids' Choice Awards. The film was also nominated at the Golden Trailer Awards for Best Animation/Family TV Spot. It earned a pair of nominations for Best Animated Film from the Saturn Awards and the Georgia Film Critics Association Awards.

Video gameKung Fu Panda: Showdown of Legendary Legends is a single and multiplayer RPG martial arts video freefire
game that features characters from all three Kung Fu Panda films. Developed by Vicious Cycle Software and published by Little Orbit, the game was released on December 1, 2015 for Microsoft Windows, Xbox 360, PlayStation 3, Nintendo 3DS, Xbox One, and PlayStation 4. The Wii U version was released on December 15, 2015.

Future
Sequel
On December 3, 2010, DreamWorks Animation CEO Jeffrey Katzenberg officially confirmed that the series could see three more sequels after Kung Fu Panda 3, bringing it to a six-film series. On January 13, 2016, Collider asked the filmmakers of Kung Fu Panda 3 about the possibility of a fourth film, with co-director Jennifer Yuh Nelson answering, "It’s one at a time. We want to make this a perfect jewel, and then we’ll see what happens after that," and co-director Alessandro Carloni replying, "With the sequels, we don’t want to try to have them feel open-ended. We want it to feel like a completed journey, and we feel this movie does. And then, if a fantastic story presents itself, great." On August 2, 2018, when asked about any updates on Kung Fu Panda 4, Nelson replied that she did not know and had always seen the series as a trilogy, but that she was open to the idea of a fourth installment, as long as the focus remained on Po.

On August 12, 2022, DreamWorks Animation officially confirmed that Kung Fu Panda 4 was in production to be released on March 8, 2024.

Television series

On April 12, 2018, a spin-off animated series of Kung Fu Panda 3, titled Kung Fu Panda: The Paws of Destiny, received a 26-episode order from Amazon Prime Video. Airing across two 13-episode seasons, respectively released in their entireties on November 16, 2018 and July 4, 2019, the series follows Po (voiced by Mick Wingert, reprising his role from previous Kung Fu Panda animated series Kung Fu Panda: Legends of Awesomeness) in the aftermath of Kung Fu Panda 3 as he mentors four young pandas — Nu Hai (voiced by Haley Tju), Jing (voiced by Laya Deleon Hayes), Bao (voiced by Gunnar Sizemore, replacing Steele Gagnon from Kung Fu Panda 3), and Fan Tong (voiced by Makana Say) — who become imbued with the chi of the ancient and powerful Kung Fu warriors known as the Four Constellations — leaving them the only ones able to save the world from an impending evil with their newfound Kung Fu powers.

On March 16, 2022, during National Panda Day, it was announced that another Kung Fu Panda animated series set after Kung Fu Panda 3, titled Kung Fu Panda: The Dragon Knight'', would premiere on Netflix in July 2022, with Jack Black reprising his role as Po. The series follows Po as he must leave his home behind and embark on a globe-trotting quest for redemption and justice that finds him partnered up with a no-nonsense English knight known as the Wandering Blade.

References

External links

 
 
 

2016 films
2016 3D films
2016 computer-animated films
2010s American animated films
20th Century Fox films
20th Century Fox animated films
American 3D films
American action comedy films
American computer-animated films
American martial arts comedy films
American sequel films
Anime-influenced Western animation
Films about giant pandas
Films directed by Jennifer Yuh Nelson
Films scored by Hans Zimmer
Films set in China
Kung Fu Panda films
Kung fu films
2010s martial arts comedy films
Films with screenplays by Jonathan Aibel and Glenn Berger
DreamWorks Animation animated films
2016 martial arts films
3D animated films
2016 comedy films
Films about father–son relationships
2010s English-language films
2010s Mandarin-language films
Animated films about revenge